Claude Percy Lemieux (born July 16, 1965), is a Canadian former professional ice hockey player who played 21 seasons in the National Hockey League (NHL) for six teams between 1983 and 2009. Lemieux won four Stanley Cup championships during his career, two with the New Jersey Devils, with whom he won the Conn Smythe Trophy during the team's victory in the 1995 Stanley Cup Finals. He is one of only 11 players to win a Stanley Cup championship with at least three teams. He is also known as one of the best playoff performers, as his 80 career playoff goals are the ninth most in NHL history.

Lemieux was born in Buckingham, Quebec, but grew up in Mont-Laurier, Quebec. He was drafted in the second round of the 1983 NHL Entry Draft by the Montreal Canadiens and played with them from 1983–1990, winning his first Stanley Cup with the team in 1986. In 1990, he was traded to the Devils, with whom he played five seasons and won a Stanley Cup. He was traded to the Colorado Avalanche in 1995 and won his second consecutive Stanley Cup during the 1996 finals. During the playoffs that season, Lemieux hit Kris Draper of the Detroit Red Wings from behind, breaking Draper's orbital, cheek, and jaw bones, and sparking a vicious rivalry between the Avalanche and Red Wings. In 1999, Lemieux was traded back to the Devils and won a second Stanley Cup with them in the 2000 finals – his fourth overall. Over the next few seasons, he played for the Phoenix Coyotes and Dallas Stars. Lemieux left the NHL in 2003 and briefly joined EV Zug of the Swiss Nationalliga A before retiring as a player. In 2005, he was named president of the ECHL's Phoenix RoadRunners, a position he held for two years. Lemieux returned to the NHL with the San Jose Sharks for the 2008–2009 season, but retired again after that year.

His son Brendan Lemieux is also an NHL player, a forward for the Philadelphia Flyers. They are the only father-son duo to be punished by the NHL for biting other players.

Playing career

NHL
Lemieux was drafted in the second round of the 1983 NHL Entry Draft by the Montreal Canadiens. He played with the Canadiens from 1983–1990, winning the Stanley Cup with the team in 1986.

In September 1990, Lemieux was traded to the New Jersey Devils for Sylvain Turgeon. Lemieux won his second Stanley Cup in 1995 as New Jersey defeated the Detroit Red Wings. Completing the postseason with 13 goals, he also won the Conn Smythe Trophy that year as the playoff MVP.

Shortly before the beginning of the 1995–96 season, Lemieux was traded to the Colorado Avalanche in a three-team deal that also involved Wendel Clark and Steve Thomas. When the Avalanche won the Stanley Cup in 1996, Lemieux became the tenth player to win back-to-back Stanley Cups with different teams.

In November 1999, Lemieux was traded back to New Jersey in a deal that sent Brian Rolston to Colorado. He won his fourth and final Stanley Cup title with the Devils in 2000. In that offseason, Lemieux signed as a free agent with the Phoenix Coyotes.

In January 2003, the Coyotes traded him to the Dallas Stars for Scott Pellerin and a conditional draft pick. Lemieux ended his NHL playing career with Dallas at the conclusion of the 2002–03 season. He played briefly the following season for EV Zug of the Swiss Nationalliga A.

Retirement
In 2005, Lemieux became president of the ECHL incarnation of the Phoenix RoadRunners until resigning in 2007.

In 2007, Lemieux took part in the second season of the Spike TV television show Pros vs. Joes. In October 2009, Lemieux began competing as a pairs figure skater on the CBC Television reality show Battle of the Blades with Shae-Lynn Bourne. For one of their routines, the pair skated to Lemieux's recorded version of Leonard Cohen's Hallelujah, which he sang as a duet with Kathryn Rose.

2008 comeback
In September 2008, on RDS, Lemieux expressed an interest in making a comeback to the NHL. He began the season with the China Sharks of the Asia League Ice Hockey before signing a contract with the Worcester Sharks on November 25. After scoring two goals and six points in 14 games with Worcester, Lemieux signed a two-way contract with the San Jose Sharks on December 29, 2008. The following day, he cleared waivers and continued to play for Worcester. On January 19, 2009, the San Jose Sharks recalled Lemieux to the NHL; on February 19, he recorded the first (and only) NHL point of his comeback, assisting on Milan Michalek's second-period goal against the Los Angeles Kings. That same year, the Sharks won the Presidents' Trophy.

International play

Lemieux represented Canada three times in international competitions over the course of his career. He made his first international appearance as a member of the Canadian national junior team at the 1985 World Junior Championships in Helsinki, Finland. Lemieux finished the tournament with 3 goals and 2 assist in 6 games to help Canada win its second World Junior gold medal. Lemieux was also a member of the 1987 Canada Cup winning team where he tallied 2 points in 6 games. His final appearance in international play came when he was selected to the Team Canada roster for the 1996 World Cup of Hockey. Lemieux picked up 19 penalty minutes in the eight games as Canada finished second.

Reception

Playing style
Throughout his career, Lemieux was noted for playing his best games during the postseason. Once Lemieux was called up to the NHL for good during the 1985–86 season, he played in 15 consecutive postseasons. In his career, starting with the 1986 playoffs, he played in the postseason 18 different years, missing only the 2001 playoffs while with the Phoenix Coyotes. Lemieux played in 234 playoff games, which is fourth all-time in the NHL. On three occasions, he scored more goals during the playoffs than during the regular season (1985–86 with Montreal, 1994–95 with New Jersey, and 1996–97 with Colorado). Lemieux retired with 80 career playoff goals, ninth all-time in the NHL.

Criticism
Lemieux was also notorious for being among the league's most hated and dirtiest players; in fact, a 2009 TSN special entitled "The Top 10 Most Hated NHL Players of All Time" ranked him second, behind only Sean Avery. While playing for Montreal, during a playoff game against the Calgary Flames, Lemieux bit Calgary's Jim Peplinski on the finger during a scuffle, prompting the Calgary winger to say, "I didn't know they allowed cannibalism in the NHL."

Hit on Kris Draper
Lemieux's reputation for playing dirty was solidified in a 1996 incident with the Avalanche when Lemieux checked Kris Draper of the Detroit Red Wings into the boards from behind during Game 6 of the Western Conference Finals. Draper suffered a concussion, broken jaw, broken nose, and broken cheekbone, all of which led to Draper having reconstructive surgery on his face and his jaw wired shut for several weeks. This incident sparked a bitter rivalry between the two teams. Unhappy with his actions, the NHL suspended him two games, which caused outcry from some fans who felt he deserved a harsher penalty. Red Wings player Dino Ciccarelli said after the series, "I can't believe I shook this guy's friggin' hand after the game. That pisses me right off."

Tensions between the two teams would continue to rise, reaching a breaking point the next season. During a fight, the infamous Red Wings–Avalanche brawl, Wings forward Darren McCarty engaged Lemieux shortly after a fight started by Peter Forsberg with Igor Larionov had stopped play. McCarty threw one punch to Lemieux, who “turtled” on the ice, and was badly beaten before the officials could remove McCarty from him. McCarty was assessed a double minor for roughing. Several fights erupted around the two as both teams, including the goalies, fought. In the next regular season game between the teams, Lemieux switched sides on the opening face off to line up across from McCarty, resulting in another fight at puck drop.

Personal life
Lemieux was born in Buckingham, Quebec, and resides in Huntington Beach, California.

Lemieux is the older brother of former NHL forward Jocelyn Lemieux. Lemieux has another brother, Serge, who was diagnosed with cerebral palsy. Despite his surname, he is not related to hockey great Mario Lemieux.

Lemieux has four children between two marriages: three sons and a daughter. One of his sons, Brendan, is a forward for the Philadelphia Flyers.

Lemieux became a naturalized U.S. citizen on 26 June 2009.

Since his retirement from the NHL, Lemieux has often been a guest on TSN's Off the Record with Michael Landsberg, sharing his personal insights on his playing days in the NHL.

Career statistics

Regular season and playoffs

International

Awards and achievements
4x Stanley Cup champion (1986, 1995, 1996, 2000)
Conn Smythe Trophy winner (1995)
QMJHL Playoff MVP (1985)
QMJHL First All-Star Team (1985)
QMJHL Second All-Star Team (1984)
Guy Lafleur Trophy (1985)
Inducted into Quebec Major Junior Hockey League Hall of Fame (2005)
9th all-time in Stanley Cup playoff goals with 80

Transactions
June 8, 1983 – Montreal Canadiens' 2nd round draft choice (26th overall) in the 1983 NHL Entry Draft.
September 4, 1990 – Traded by the Montreal Canadiens to the New Jersey Devils in exchange for Sylvain Turgeon.
October 3, 1995 – Traded by the New Jersey Devils to the New York Islanders in exchange for Steve Thomas.
October 3, 1995 – Traded by the New York Islanders to the Colorado Avalanche in exchange for Wendel Clark.
November 3, 1999 – Traded by the Colorado Avalanche, along with Colorado's 1st round draft choice (David Hale) and 2nd round draft choice (Matt DeMarchi) in the 2000 NHL Entry Draft, to the New Jersey Devils in exchange for Brian Rolston and New Jersey's 2nd round draft choice (Martin Samuelsson) in the 2000 NHL Entry Draft.
December 5, 2000 – Signed as a free agent with the Phoenix Coyotes.
January 16, 2003 – Traded by the Phoenix Coyotes to the Dallas Stars in exchange for Scott Pellerin and Dallas' 4th round draft choice (Kevin Porter) in the 2004 NHL Entry Draft.
December 29, 2008 – Signed as a free agent with the San Jose Sharks.

See also
Notable families in the NHL

References

External links

Claude Lemieux discusses his career at The Hockey Writers

1965 births
Living people
Battle of the Blades participants
Canadian emigrants to the United States
Canadian expatriate ice hockey players in China
Canadian expatriate ice hockey players in the United States
Canadian ice hockey right wingers
Canadian people of French descent
China Dragon players
Colorado Avalanche players
Conn Smythe Trophy winners
Dallas Stars players
EV Zug players
French Quebecers
Ice hockey people from Gatineau
Montreal Canadiens draft picks
Montreal Canadiens players
Naturalized citizens of the United States
New Jersey Devils players
Nova Scotia Voyageurs players
People from Mont-Laurier
Phoenix Coyotes players
San Jose Sharks players
Sherbrooke Canadiens players
Stanley Cup champions
Trois-Rivières Draveurs players
Verdun Junior Canadiens players
Verdun Juniors players
Worcester Sharks players